Peščenica – Žitnjak is a city district in the southeastern part of Zagreb, Croatia. It consists of two parts: Peščenica, a set of neighborhoods; and Žitnjak, a large industrial zone on the city outskirts, and has a total population of 56,487 (2011 census).

The smaller neighbourhoods that form the core of Peščenica include:
 Stara Peščenica
 Donje Svetice
 Volovčica
 Ferenščica

These neighborhoods are delineated by major city arterials, such as the Slavonska Avenue and Vukovarska Avenue.

To the northeast, towards Donja Dubrava, there are:
 Borongaj (local administration "Bruno Bušić")
 Borongaj Lugovi
 Vukomerec

To the southwest, towards Trnje, there are:
 Borovje
 Folnegovićevo naselje
 local administration "Oton Župančić"

The places in the outer rim, around and beyond Žitnjak, include:
 Kozari Bok
 Kozari putevi
 Savica–Šanci
 Petruševec
 Resnik
 Ivanja Reka
 Žitnjak (Struge)

History
Stara Peščenica and Volovčica were first planned in 1913 and built after World War I. Donje Svetice, Ferenščica, Borongaj, Folnegovićevo naselje and Vukomerec were started then and built up mostly after World War II.

Žitnjak is named after wheat, as it used to be the location of wheat fields. In 1865, it was a small settlement of 10 houses and 177 inhabitants. After World War II, it became an industrial zone.

Resnik and Ivanja Reka were previously villages, and their first mention dates from 1217. They were urbanized after World War II, particularly in the 1980s.

Ivanja Reka remains a standalone settlement, but Resnik stopped being tracked as one after 1971, when it had 456 residents.

Peščenica has been made famous locally by its resident and self-proclaimed president of the "Republic of Peščenica" Željko Malnar, a maverick traveler, author and talk show host.

References

External links 
 unofficial web site of Volovčica
 Fishing in Peščenica - Lake Savica (ŠRD Peščenica)

Districts of Zagreb